The 1953 SFR Yugoslavia Chess Championship was the 9th edition of SFR Yugoslav Chess Championship. Held in Zagreb, SFR Yugoslavia, SR Croatia. The tournament was won by Vasja Pirc.
First three players were tied for 1st, so they played champions play-off.

Table and results

References 

Yugoslav Chess Championships
1953 in chess
Chess